Hat Creek is a census designated place (CDP) in Shasta County, California. Its population is 266 as of the 2020 census, down from 309 from the 2010 census.

Its zip code is 96040. Wired telephone numbers are from the Burney central office and follow the pattern 530-335-xxxx. Hat Creek is home to the Hat Creek Radio Observatory, run by SETI Institute.

The town's main economies are tourism, fishing, camping, and lodging.

In 2021 the town was threatened by the Dixie Fire.

Geography

Climate
Hat Creek has a warm-summer Mediterranean climate (Csb) according to the Köppen climate classification system.

Demographics

The 2010 United States Census reported that Hat Creek had a population of 309. The population density was 6.2 people per square mile (2.4/km2). The racial makeup of Hat Creek was 239 (77.3%) White, 4 (1.3%) African American, 45 (14.6%) Native American, 2 (0.6%) Asian, 4 (1.3%) Pacific Islander, 9 (2.9%) from other races, and 6 (1.9%) from two or more races.  Hispanic or Latino of any race were 20 persons (6.5%).

The Census reported that 301 people (97.4% of the population) lived in households, 8 (2.6%) lived in non-institutionalized group quarters, and 0 (0%) were institutionalized.

There were 133 households, out of which 31 (23.3%) had children under the age of 18 living in them, 75 (56.4%) were opposite-sex married couples living together, 11 (8.3%) had a female householder with no husband present, 3 (2.3%) had a male householder with no wife present. There were 6 (4.5%) unmarried opposite-sex partnerships, and 1 (0.8%) same-sex married couples or partnerships. 38 households (28.6%) were made up of individuals, and 17 (12.8%) had someone living alone who was 65 years of age or older. The average household size was 2.26. There were 89 families (66.9% of all households); the average family size was 2.79.

The population was spread out, with 59 people (19.1%) under the age of 18, 21 people (6.8%) aged 18 to 24, 55 people (17.8%) aged 25 to 44, 110 people (35.6%) aged 45 to 64, and 64 people (20.7%) who were 65 years of age or older. The median age was 51.9 years. For every 100 females, there were 96.8 males. For every 100 females age 18 and over, there were 96.9 males.

There were 194 housing units at an average density of 3.9 per square mile (1.5/km2), of which 93 (69.9%) were owner-occupied, and 40 (30.1%) were occupied by renters. The homeowner vacancy rate was 3.1%; the rental vacancy rate was 6.8%. 199 people (64.4% of the population) lived in owner-occupied housing units and 102 people (33.0%) lived in rental housing units.

Politics

References

Census-designated places in Shasta County, California
Census-designated places in California